The Motorola V525 is a mobile phone made by the company Motorola and is a phone which is exclusive to the Vodafone network or otherwise has to be unblocked to be used on any other network. This is a stylish flip phone which is similar in looks to the Motorola V500.

Product Features 
Integrated camera
Bluetooth wireless technology
Make calls globally with Quad Band
MP3 & Polyphonic Ringtones
Picture Phonebook
Built-in Speakerphone
MMS (Picture / photo + text + sound)
EMS 5.0
SMS Chat one-to-one
21 Embedded Polyphonic ringtones, 4 MP3 Ringtones
22 kHz Polyphonic Speaker, 22 Chord support
Downloadable Themes: animated screensavers, wallpapers and ringtones
Java ME Games: Stuntman & Monopoly (Embedded & downloadable)
MotoMixer (Remixable MIDI ringer software)
User-customisable Softkey Functions, Main Menu and Shortcuts
Caller Group Profiling (Ringer & Icon)
Phone Book: Up to 1000 entries
Time and Date Stamp
VibraCall
Voice-activated Dialling

Technical data 
Form factor: Clam
Internal memory 5 MB
Colour: Silver
Dimensions (h × w × d): 89 × 49 × 24.8 mm
Volume: 86 cm³
Weight including the battery: 123 g
Weight excluding the battery: 113 g
Display: Internal: 65k TFT Colour (176 × 220)
4 lines of text and 1 line of icons
Display: External: 2 line (96 × 32, with blue backlight)
Bands: Quad Band (900/1800/1900/850 MHz)
Standard battery: SNN5704 battery min 650 mAh
Standby time (hours): 120-200
Talk time (mins): 180-390
GPRS (2u/4d) AMR
WAP Browser version 2.0
Connectivity Bluetooth wireless technology (1.1)/CE Bus 
(USB/Serial)

Firmware
Language Package 0001 (US English)
Language Package 0002 (UK English)
Language Package 0003 (US English, Canadian French, American Spanish, Brazilian Portuguese) 
Language Package 0014 (UK English, Complex Chinese)
Language Package 0015 (US English, Simplified Chinese)
Language Package 0016 (US English, Complex Chinese)
Language Package 001B (US English, Canadian French, American Spanish)
Language Package 0021 (UK English, Thai, Vietnamese, Bahasa)
Language Package 0024 (UK English, Simplified Chinese)
Language Package 002C (UK English, Danish, Swedish, Norwegian, Finnish, German, Russian)
Language Package 002D (UK English, Estonian, Latvian, Lithuanian, Finnish, Polish, Russian)
Language Package 002E (UK English, German, Russian, Ukrainian, French, Spanish, Portuguese)
Language Package 002F (UK English, Hungarian, Polish, Czech, Slovak, Slovenian, Croatian)
Language Package 0030 (UK English, Bulgarian, Croatian, Romanian, Serbian, Slovenian, German)
Language Package 0031 (UK English, Greek, Romanian, Bulgarian, Italian, German, and Russian)
Language Package 0032 (UK English, French, Arabic, German, Russian, Spanish, Turkish)
Language Package 0033 (UK English, French, Hebrew, Arabic, Russian, Spanish, Turkish)
Language Package 0034 (UK English, French, Urdu, Farsi, Arabic, Russian, Spanish)
Language Package 0035 (UK English, Swedish, Romanian, Polish, Hungarian, and Greek)
Language Package 0036 (UK English, Danish, Polish, Russian, and Slovak)
Language Package 0037 (UK English, German, Dutch, Polish, Hungarian, Czech, Croatian)
Language Package 0038 (UK English, French, German, Italian, Spanish, Turkish, Greek)
Language Package 0039 (UK English, French, German, Italian, Spanish, Dutch, Turkish, Portuguese)
Language Package 004B (UK English, Hindi)
Language Package 004D (UK English, Complex Chinese, Simplified Chinese)

External links

V525

ru:Motorola V525